James A. Boucher (March 27, 1937 – September 20, 2020) was an American politician. He served as a member of the Wyoming House of Representatives.

Life and career 
Boucher was raised in Wauseon, Ohio, the son of Marion and Harold Boucher. He attended Ohio Wesleyan University and Southern College of Optometry. He served in the United States Air Force.

In 1975, Boucher was elected to the Wyoming House of Representatives, representing Albany County, Wyoming, serving until 1976.

Boucher died in September 2020, at the age of 83.

References 

1937 births
2020 deaths
Members of the Wyoming House of Representatives
20th-century American politicians
Ohio Wesleyan University alumni